Mahamoud Moustapha Daher is a Djiboutian politician who has served as a member of the Pan-African Parliament representing Djibouti and the Parliament of Djibouti as the Minister of National Education and Vocational Training.

References

Djiboutian politicians
Members of the Pan-African Parliament from Djibouti